Venus is an unincorporated community in Clarion and Venango counties, Pennsylvania, United States. Venus has a post office with ZIP code 16364.

The camp meeting of First Bible Holiness Church, a Methodist denomination in the conservative holiness movement, is held in annually at the denomination's campground in Venus.

References

Unincorporated communities in Clarion County, Pennsylvania
Unincorporated communities in Venango County, Pennsylvania
Unincorporated communities in Pennsylvania